The first Karnali Provincial Assembly was elected by the 2017 provincial elections. 40 members were elected to the assembly, 24 of whom were elected through direct elections and 16 of whom were elected through the party list proportional representation system. The term of the assembly started on 4 February 2018 and ended in September 2022. Mahendra Bahadur Shahi from the CPN (Maoist Centre) and Jeevan Bahadur Shahi from the Nepali Congress served as chief ministers during the term of the assembly. Raj Bahadur Shahi served as the speaker of the assembly and Pushpa Bahadur Gharti served as the deputy speaker.

Composition

Leaders

Speaker 

 Speaker of the Provincial Assembly: Hon. Raj Bahadur Shahi
 Deputy Speaker of the Provincial Assembly: Pushpa Ghari Bista

Parliamentary Party Leaders 

 Leader of the House (Nepali Congress): Hon. Jeevan Bahadur Shahi
 Leader of Opposition (CPN (UML)): Yam Lal Kandel
 Parliamentary Party Leader (CPN (Maoist Centre)): Mahendra Bahadur Shahi
 Parliamentary Party Leader (Rastriya Prajatantra Party): Soshila Shahi

Whips 

 Government Chief Whip (Nepali Congress): Him Bahadur Shahi
 Whip (Nepali Congress): Amrita Shahi
 Opposition Chief Whip (CPN(UML)): Gulab Jung Shah

Members

Changes

See also 

 Karnali Province
 2017 Nepalese provincial elections

References 

Members of the Provincial Assembly of Karnali Province